Ellery may refer to:

 Ellery (duo), an American pop group
 Ellery (given name)
 Ellery (surname)
 Ellery, New York, a US town
 Ellery, Illinois, a US town

See also
 Ellery Lake, a lake in Ontario, Canada
 Mount Ellery, Australia
 Mount Ellery (Antarctica)
 Ellery Bop, a 1980s British pop group
 Eleri (disambiguation)
 Elery (disambiguation)
 Ellery Queen (disambiguation)